Lake Arpi National Park is one of four protected national parks of Armenia. Occupying an area of 250 km2, it is in the northwestern Shirak Province. Formed in 2009, it is located around Lake Arpi at the Shirak and Javkheti plateau, at a height of 2000 meters above sea level. The park is surrounded by the Yeghnakhagh mountains in the west and the Javakheti Range in the northwest.

See also 
 List of protected areas of Armenia

References

National parks of Armenia
Tourist attractions in Syunik Province
Arpi
Ramsar sites in Armenia
Geography of Shirak Province